The 1984 Temple Owls football team was an American football team that represented Temple University as an independent during the 1984 NCAA Division I-A football season. In its second season under head coach Bruce Arians, the team compiled a 6–5 record and outscored opponents by a total of 226 to 180. The team played its home games at Veterans Stadium in Philadelphia. 

The team's statistical leaders included Lee Saltz with 1,337 passing yards, Paul Palmer with 885 rushing yards and 60 points scored, and Willie Marshall with 503 receiving yards.

Schedule

References

Temple
Temple Owls football seasons
Temple Owls football